Christian Vater may refer to:
 Christian Vater (organ builder)
 Christian Vater (social entrepreneur)